SBS WorldWatch is an Australian free-to-air television channel owned and operated by the Special Broadcasting Service (SBS). The channel shows multilingual international news bulletins in more than 30 languages, as well as two local bulletins in Mandarin and Arabic.

History
In early 2022, SBS officially launched their own Arabic and Mandarin local news bulletins on SBS On Demand and announced the launch of the WorldWatch channel. The channel would also offer non-English news bulletins in more than 30 languages from around the world; most of these were transferred from the World Watch programming block, which had aired on SBS and SBS Viceland. The channel was launched on 23 May 2022 on channel 35, along with the SBS-produced Arabic and Mandarin bulletins. Both SBS and SBS Viceland continued to air English news bulletins from international news channels in morning and midday timeslots under the current World Watch block.

Programming

News bulletins

Local news bulletins
(aired on Weeknights)

 SBS Arabic News
 SBS Mandarin News

Repeat programs
(in English language with Arabic and Mandarin subtitles)
 Dateline
 The Feed (archived episodes)
 Insight
 Living Black
 The Point
 Small Business Secrets

Current international news bulletins

Former international news bulletins

Late night simulcasts
 DW English
 France 24 English

Notes

See also 
 SBS World News Channel, a similar channel which ran from 2002 to 2009

References

External links

Special Broadcasting Service
Television channels and stations established in 2022
2022 establishments in Australia
24-hour television news channels in Australia